V44 is a brand of pure super premium wheat-vodka produced by the Bratislava-based company European Spirits and Liquor. Its name comes from numbers of sample variations. The basic vodka recipe is from a 1405 Baltic document, and is claimed to be the world's oldest officially registered surviving vodka recipe. V44 is 100% unflavoured. Its taste and consistency is mainly achieved by using a special type of bio wheat, a proprietary fermentation process and by the cold gravity filtration processes. The production volume each year is limited to the available specified wheat. V44 Vodka is 44% alcohol and kosher certified.

External links
V44 Vodka  — Official website.
Revealing The Redefinition Of Premium Vodka V44 — Press release announcing the introduction of the vodka.

Kosher drinks
Lithuanian vodkas
Lithuanian brands